The Giro del Lazio is a semi classic European bicycle race held in the region of Lazio, Italy. From 2005 to 2008, the race has been organised as a 1.HC event on the UCI Europe Tour.

In past years it was also held as Giro delle Quattro Provincie, Gran premio di Roma and Gran Premio Littoria.

The Giro del Lazio returned to the race calendar in 2013 and 2014 following a hiatus since 2008 as the Roma Maxima. The race hasn't been held since 2015.

Winners

References

External links
 

UCI Europe Tour races
Cycle races in Italy
Classic cycle races
Defunct cycling races in Italy
Recurring sporting events established in 1933
1933 establishments in Italy
 
Sport in Lazio
Recurring sporting events disestablished in 2014
2014 disestablishments in Italy